"21 Questions" is a song by American rapper 50 Cent featuring fellow American rapper and singer Nate Dogg. It was released in March 2003 through Interscope Records, Dr. Dre's Aftermath Entertainment, Eminem's Shady Records, and 50 Cent's own G-Unit Records as the second single from 50 Cent's debut studio album Get Rich or Die Tryin'. Unlike his previous singles and most of the songs on the album, "21 Questions" is an R&B-influenced love song, largely themed around a series of questions pertaining to a relationship between 50 Cent and an unnamed girlfriend. It contains elements of Barry White's 1978 song "It's Only Love Doing Its Thing".

"21 Questions" peaked at #1 on the US Billboard Hot 100 chart in May 2003, becoming the second consecutive chart-topping single for 50 Cent, following the album's lead single, "In Da Club", and the first for Nate Dogg. In total, 21 Questions spent four weeks atop the Hot 100 and twenty-three weeks on the chart. It was also successful internationally, reaching the top ten in the Netherlands, New Zealand and the United Kingdom, and the top five in Canada and Australia.

Background
When producer Dr. Dre worked with 50 Cent on his debut album, he objected to the song being included on the tracklist. According to 50 Cent;.
50 Cent responded saying;

Music video
Directed by Damon Johnson, Dr. Dre and Phillip Atwell in March 2003, the music video for "21 Questions" depicts 50 Cent being arrested and confined to prison, where he tries to keep in touch with his girlfriend, played by Meagan Good. In prison, he is constantly harassed by a rival inmate (Tyson Beckford). The video ends with a continuation of the beginning, showing 50 Cent and his girlfriend watching from their home as the police arrest Beckford instead; the prison scenes are revealed to be a hypothetical scenario imagined by a worried 50 Cent. The video has cameo appearances by Nate Dogg (who provides vocals on the chorus and the outro) and fellow G-Unit members Lloyd Banks and Young Buck as other inmates.

On April 15, 2003, the video debuted on MTV's Total Request Live at number six, reached number one two days later, and stayed on the chart for 50 days. It also reached number two on the MuchMusic video charts.

Remixes
Official remixes of the single includes featured artists among the likes of Nate Dogg, Monica, Free and Lil' Mo, all of whom have either rapped or sung their own verses over the song's instrumentals.

21 Answers

"21 Answers" is a remix by Lil' Mo and former 106 & Park co-host Free, which was released as an 'answer track' to "21 Questions." Kevin "Dirty Swift" Risto, one-half of Midi Mafia, originally penned the idea of creating a female response record; he immediately got in touch with R&B singer Lil' Mo and added former 106 & Park personality Free to the mix. The song then premiered on New York's Hot 97 radio station—resulting in numerous rotations on various radio stations around the country—and later debuted on Billboard Hot R&B/Hip-Hop Songs at number 77. Although the song went on to spend eleven weeks on the chart based solely on airplay, it failed to see a release on Lil' Mo's second album Meet the Girl Next Door (2003), due to the song not being finalized in time to meet the album's deadline. However, because of Elektra Records' 2004 merging with Atlantic, the song appeared on the 2011 re-release of Meet the Girl Next Door.

Charts

Track listings
 UK CD single
 "21 Questions" - 3:44
 "Soldier (Freestyle with G-Unit) - 3:18
 "21 Questions" (Live from New York) - 4:54
 "21 Questions" (Music Video) - 3:49
 French CD single
 "21 Questions" - 3:44
 "21 Answers" (featuring Monica) - 4:03

Credits and personnel
 Producer: Dirty Swift of Midi Mafia
 Mixed by: Dr. Dre
 Recorded by: Sha Money XL and Maurico "Veto" Iragorri
 Protool edits by: Carlise Young
 Assisted by: Ruben Rivera

Charts

Weekly charts

Year-end charts

Certifications

Myke Towers version

In 2020, Puerto Rican rapper/singer Myke Towers released a Spanish version of the song titled Girl for his album Easy Money Baby. His version is all in the same rhythm as the original but the message of the lyrics is different. His version entered the charts in the Hispanic market and was certified quintuple platinum in the United States.

Charts

Certifications

References

External links
 

2003 singles
50 Cent songs
Nate Dogg songs
Billboard Hot 100 number-one singles
Songs written by 50 Cent
Contemporary R&B ballads
Shady Records singles
Aftermath Entertainment singles
Interscope Records singles
Sony Music Latin singles
Elektra Records singles
Universal Music Group singles
Song recordings produced by Midi Mafia
2003 songs
Songs about crime
G-Unit Records singles